Ryan A. Eversley (born December 22, 1983) is an American professional auto racing driver. Since 2015, Eversley has been a Honda factory driver who primarily races in sports car racing championships such as the Michelin Pilot Challenge and Pirelli World Challenge. He won the 2018 PWC TCR championship.

Early career
Though his parents could not fund his racing career, they were supportive and helped Eversley to find opportunities. He left public school and pursued his high school degree in a homeschooling program so he could pursue a driving career.

Eversley got a job from Mike Johnson in 2001 with the Archangel Racing Team as a mechanic, allowing him to leave his full-time job at the local mill. He vowed that his entrance into motor sports would allow him to never need to return to the mill.

"I was one of the first guys in the shop every day and I was the one they had to tell to go home because I was so excited to be working on prototypes at 16 and 17 years old," Eversley stated in an interview on the Marshall Pruett Podcast in 2016. His first race as a mechanic was with the Archangel team the Rolex 24 Hours of Daytona in 2001.

Using the money he made working, Eversley went to the Panoz Racing Schools at Road Atlanta and raced go-karts whenever possible to gain experience. A driver himself, Mike Johnson was able to help Eversley get seat time and eventually a ride in the Continental Tire Series.

First race
Eversley's first race took place in Sonoma in the Spring of 2003 in a Star Mazda. In his own words:  “I rented a ride from a kid I met on Auto Racing AOL chatroom. This kid, Chris Nelson, him and his dad Bob Nelson help me out”. The Nelsons had the car, but didn't have enough money to race it. Eversley continues: “They said come to Sonoma. As long as you don’t crash you’re fine. It was kind of nerve wracking, because I don’t have two pennies to rub together… We go. I finish dead last, I sucked and I was so happy.”

Major racing (2003–present)

2003
Debuted in ST I class. He finished 16th in only one race at Virginia International Raceway.

2004
In 2004, James Cook offered Eversley a ride in three IMSA races if he would build the car for him. Eversley accepted and created a team with Crew Chief Jason Duncan. They built the B2K/40 Lola with a Millington turbo engine and raced it at Mid-Ohio, Lime Rock and Road Atlanta in the LMP2 class. Though the class was small, the car finished 2nd in each race.

Finished 15th in lone ST race at Homestead-Miami Speedway.

2006
Did not score any points after driving in four races.

2007
Finished 83rd in GS points. ... Three races, best finish 15th at Daytona International Speedway.

2008
Finished 26th in GS points. ... Seven races, best finish ninth at New Jersey Motorsports Park.

2009
Eversley competed in the 24 Hours of Daytona in the GT class for Stevenson Motorsports. The team finished 22nd overall and 13th in class.

2010
Eversley competed in the SCCA Pro Racing World Challenge race at the Mid-Ohio Sports Car Course and won both rounds of the TC class in his series debut. He made another Rolex Sports Car Series start in 2010 for Matt Connolly Motorsports at Barber Motorsports Park. The team failed to finish the race. He also drove in the American Le Mans Series' Petit Le Mans for Magnus Racing in the GTC class and finished third in class. Finished 84th in GS points. Four races, best finish 10th at Virginia International Raceway. Eversley drives in the Continental Tire Sports Car Challenge for Compass360 Racing in the ST class. He captured a class victory in the race at Virginia International Raceway. He also competed in the 2011 24 Hours of Daytona for The Racer's Group in the Children's Tumor Foundation charity Porsche. The team finished 20th overall and 8th in class.

2015
2015 was his first year competing full-time in the Pirelli World Challenge series in the GT class. In the first Pirelli World Challenge race of 2015, the Nissan Grand Prix of Texas at the Circuit of the Americas in Austin, TX, Eversley, in the No. 43 RealTime/Acura Motorsports/HPD Acura TLX-GT, rocketed up to finish fifth after starting 25th on the day. Eversley was awarded the Optima Batteries Best Start Award for gaining eight positions, and the VP Racing Fuels Hard Charger Award for gaining 20 positions in the race.

Driving an Acura TLX for RealTime Racing, Eversley recorded a win at St. Petersburg, ultimately finishing 6th in the GT standings.

2016
Eversley returned to World Challenge racing with RealTime in 2016, again driving the TLX. He recorded back-to-back wins at Road America, finishing 6th in the GT standings for the second year in a row with four podiums.

2017
RealTime Racing returned to the World Challenge in 2017 with a new program in the Acura NSX GT3. They scored one podium with a 2nd-place finish at Utah, but Eversley reported in the Mario Andretti episode of his Dinner With Racers podcast that the team is struggling with downforce in their first year in development with the new car.

2018
In December 2017, Eversley announced that he would be joining Honda of America Racing Team (HART) in 2018 to drive an Acura NSX GT3 with co-driver Chad Gilsinger in Tequila Patron North American Endurance Cup races.

In the inaugural season of the Pirelli World Challenge TCR class, Eversley won five races to clinch the championship.

2019
A few weeks prior to the opening weekend of the Blancpain GT Series of America, Eversley announced his commitment to the Gradient Racing team, running an Acura NSX GT3 Evo. Eversley continued his IMSA career with co-driver Chad Gilsinger in HART's Honda Civic Type R TCR under the Michelin Pilot Challenge.

In July, he made his Stadium Super Trucks debut at Honda Indy Toronto, driving the No. 43 Continental Tire truck. The following month, he competed in the series' second Mid-Ohio Sports Car Course weekend. In the Friday round, he was involved in a wreck with Jeff Hoffman on the first lap that sent his truck into a flip before landing on its wheels; although he finished fourth, he was promoted to third when Cole Potts received a one-position penalty for cutting the course.

2020
Eversley joined the LA Honda World team in the Michelin Pilot Challenge for 2020.

2021
On June 18, 2021, Eversley announced he would make his NASCAR Cup Series debut at Road America in the No. 53 for Rick Ware Racing.

Children's Tumor Foundation charity work
After driving the Children's Tumor Foundation (CTF) charity car in the 2011 24 Hours of Daytona, Eversley has been committed to raising money and awareness to battle neurofibromatosis, a condition that causes tumors to form in the brain, spinal cord, and nerves. Over the last few years Eversley has raised tens of thousands of dollars for CTF, largely through an annual event called the Cupid's Undie Run, which he and other team members run in their underwear every February.

Dinner with Racers podcast
Eversley co-hosts the racing podcast Dinner with Racers with Sean Heckman. They travel across the United States to interview other racing drivers, team owners, engineers and general motorsports personalities over meals. The show has had 3 seasons and over 90 guests from various motorsports series, mostly focused on American racing series like NASCAR, IndyCar and the WeatherTech SportsCar Championship.

Personal life
Ryan is the son of veteran sports car racing mechanic John Eversley. He currently resides in Atlanta, Georgia. His daily driver is an Acura MDX with Continental tires.

Motorsports career results
(key)

Pirelli World Challenge results

* Season is still in progress.

Continental Tire SportsCar Challenge results

Grand-Am Rolex Sports Car Series

American Le Mans Series

Complete WeatherTech SportsCar Championship results
(key) (Races in bold indicate pole position; results in italics indicate fastest lap)

Stadium Super Trucks
(key) (Bold – Pole position. Italics – Fastest qualifier. * – Most laps led.)

NASCAR
(key) (Bold – Pole position awarded by qualifying time. Italics – Pole position earned by points standings or practice time. * – Most laps led.)

Cup Series

Xfinity Series

 Season still in progress
 Ineligible for series points

References

External links

1983 births
American podcasters
Living people
24 Hours of Daytona drivers
Rolex Sports Car Series drivers
Sportspeople from DeKalb County, Georgia
American Le Mans Series drivers
People from Lithonia, Georgia
Racing drivers from Atlanta
Racing drivers from Georgia (U.S. state)
WeatherTech SportsCar Championship drivers
Stadium Super Trucks drivers
24H Series drivers
NASCAR drivers
GT World Challenge America drivers
Starworks Motorsport drivers
Michelin Pilot Challenge drivers